Albotricha is a genus of fungi within the Hyaloscyphaceae family. The genus contains 19 species.

References

External links
Albotricha at Index Fungorum

Hyaloscyphaceae